Akash Neil Nandy (born 10 January 1997 in Kuala Lumpur) is a racing driver from Malaysia. He currently competes in the F3 Asian Championship having previously competed in the GP3 Series.

Racing record

Career summary

Complete GP3 Series results
(key) (Races in bold indicate pole position) (Races in italics indicate fastest lap)

Complete F3 Asian Championship results
(key) (Races in bold indicate pole position) (Races in italics indicate fastest lap)

References

External links

 Profile at Driver Database
 Official website

Malaysian racing drivers
1997 births
Living people
Malaysian people of Indian descent
GP3 Series drivers
Toyota Racing Series drivers
Sportspeople from Kuala Lumpur
F3 Asian Championship drivers

Formula Masters China drivers
Asian Le Mans Series drivers
Formula Renault Eurocup drivers
Formula Renault 2.0 Alps drivers
Austrian Formula Three Championship drivers
TCR Asia Series drivers
Team Meritus drivers
KCMG drivers
Tech 1 Racing drivers
Performance Racing drivers
Jenzer Motorsport drivers
Pinnacle Motorsport drivers